Thomas J. LaBonge (October 6, 1953 – January 7, 2021) was an American politician. A member of the Democratic Party, he served on the Los Angeles City Council from 2001 to 2015, representing the city's 4th district.

Education
A graduate of John Marshall High School, LaBonge received his bachelor's degree in sociology from California State University, Los Angeles.

Career
He was a member of the Los Angeles City Council representing the 4th district, serving from 2001 to 2015. He won a special election to fill the seat left vacant by the death of long-time council member John Ferraro. The district included a wide diversity of incomes and neighborhoods. During his time in office, he was the Chairman of the Arts, Parks, Health and Aging Committee, Vice Chairman of the Transportation Committee and the Ad Hoc River Committee, and a member of the Trade, Commerce & Tourism Committee, and the Ad Hoc on Recovering Energy, Natural Resources & Economic Benefit from Waste for L.A. (RENEW LA) in the city of Los Angeles. He was a member of the Democratic Party.

Before serving as councilman, LaBonge was Director of Community Relations at the Department of Water and Power, Special Assistant to Mayor Richard Riordan, and Chief Deputy to Council President John Ferraro. LaBonge was a lifelong advocate for Griffith Park, one of the largest urban parks in the nation, which fell in his old council district.

Personal life
He married graphic designer and illustrator Brigid Manning LaBonge in 1988. Before his death, LaBonge resided in the Silver Lake district of Los Angeles with his wife and their two children, Mary-Cate and Charles.

Death
LaBonge died on January 7, 2021, at the age of 67.

References

External links

1953 births
2021 deaths
California Democrats
California State University, Los Angeles alumni
Los Angeles City Council members
People from Silver Lake, Los Angeles